Blaize Clement (August 18, 1932 – July 20, 2011) was an American writer. She is best known for her series of "Dixie Hemingway" mystery novels published by St. Martin's Press, a division of Macmillan. The series has been carried on by her son, John Clement.

"Dixie Hemingway" novels in order
Curiosity Killed the Cat Sitter (2005) 
Duplicity Dogged the Dachshund  (2007) 
Even Cat Sitters Get the Blues (2008) 
Cat Sitter on a Hot Tin Roof (2009) 
Raining Cat sitters and Dogs (2010) 
Cat sitter Among the Pigeons (2011) 
Cat sitter's Pajamas (2012) 
The Cat Sitter's Cradle (2013) (by John Clement) 
The Cat Sitter's Nine Lives (2014) (by John Clement) 
The Cat Sitter's Whiskers (2015) (by John Clement)

Other publications
 Kids Stay Free (Kindle Edition 2011) 
 I, Malcolm (Kindle Edition 2011) 
 In The Beginning – An Introduction to Hinduism, Buddhism and Taoism" (Kindle Edition 2010) 
 The Loving Parent – A Guide to Growing Up Before Your Children Do'' (Impact Publishers 1981)

References

 Sarasota Herald Tribune
 Blaize Clement Official Website
 Dixie Hemingway Mysteries at St. Martin's Press

External links
 Blaize Clement Profile at Macmillan Publishing
 2009 Interview by Julie Compton for International Thriller Writers

1932 births
2011 deaths
21st-century American novelists
American mystery writers
American women novelists
People from Grayson County, Texas
Novelists from Texas
Women mystery writers
21st-century American women writers
20th-century American novelists
20th-century American women writers